Chloraspilates is a genus of moths in the family Geometridae.

Species
 Chloraspilates bicoloraria Packard, 1876
 Chloraspilates minima (Hulst, 1898)

References
 Chloraspilates at Markku Savela's Lepidoptera and Some Other Life Forms
 Natural History Museum Lepidoptera genus database

Caberini
Geometridae genera